Michelle Zeltner (born 22 December 1991) is a Swiss athlete who specialises in the heptathlon. She competed in the heptathlon event at the 2016 European Championships in Amsterdam, Netherlands.

Personal bests

Outdoor

Indoor

References

External links 
 

1991 births
Living people
Swiss female athletes
Swiss heptathletes